Natural Chimneys, known as the Cyclopean Towers in the 19th century, is a natural rock structure located near Mt. Solon in Augusta County, Virginia in the United States, in the Shenandoah Valley. The formation is a central feature of a regional park owned and operated by Augusta County. 

The chimneys are formed from limestone that began to accumulate and harden into stone about 500 million years ago in the Paleozoic Era, when the region was underwater. Over time, enormous upward pressures of magma and widespread geologic upheaval, which created the Appalachian Mountains, combined with erosive forces of water and destroyed weaker layers of stone. Eventually, this created the rock chimneys which can be seen today.

The park, located along the North River, has a 145-site campground with a pool, playground, and hiking trails. The park also hosts one of the largest jousting tournaments in the eastern United States. The tournament is held on the third Saturday of August, and has taken place annually since 1821. Augusta County owns the property and maintains the facility.

Gallery

References

External links

Augusta County Parks & Recreation: Natural Chimneys Regional Park website

Landforms of Augusta County, Virginia
Parks in Augusta County, Virginia
Regional parks in Virginia
Rock formations of the United States
Virginia municipal and county parks